The discography of English singer-songwriter Gareth Gates consists of three studio albums, nine singles, nine music videos and one live DVD. Gates rose to fame after appearing as a contestant on the first series of British television talent contest Pop Idol in 2002. After finishing as runner-up behind Will Young, Gates was given a recording contract with BMG and released his first single, a cover of "Unchained Melody", which was a number-one hit in the UK in March 2002. He went on to have three further number one singles in the UK Singles Chart (one of which was a duet with Young) and three albums that reached the top 30, including his debut album which reached number two in the UK Albums Chart.

Albums

Studio albums

Compilation albums

Singles

Music videos

References

External links
 
 
 

Discographies of British artists
Pop music discographies